The GE C40-8 is a model of 6-axle diesel-electric locomotive built by GE Transportation Systems between 1987 and 1992. It is part of the GE Dash 8 Series of freight locomotives, and its wheel arrangement is of a C-C type.

This locomotive model is often referred to as a Dash 8-40C or simply "Dash 8". "Dash 8" in general refers to the electrical control series, "Dash" being a carryover from the older syntax of C40-8.

Later units were supplied with a wide-nose cab and are designated Dash 8-40CW, the "W" indicating a wide-nose cab.

C41-8 
Some railroads, the Chicago and North Western Railway in particular, upgraded some of their units to ~ and designated them as C42-8. This designation was modified by the Union Pacific Railroad to C41-8 after its takeover of C&NW in 1995. Former C&NW units are usually identified by a grab-iron on the front nose just above the Union Pacific shield logo, and/or the "C41-8" designation on the cab side. Although none of these units were ever officially classed as C41-8 by GE, a safety cab version was built as the Dash 8-41CW.

Current and former owners

See also 

 List of GE locomotives

External links 

Railway locomotives introduced in 1987
Dash 8-40C
C-C locomotives
Diesel-electric locomotives of the United States
Diesel-electric locomotives of Brazil
Freight locomotives